The Canadian Certificate of Identity is an international travel document issued by Immigration, Refugees and Citizenship Canada (formerly by Passport Canada) to a permanent resident of Canada who is not yet a Canadian citizen, is stateless, or is otherwise unable to obtain a national passport or travel document. It is a biometric document with a grey (formerly brown) cover and is bilingual in both English and French. The validity period of the travel document is determined by the issuing office.

Eligibility

The applicant must either be stateless, or be unable to obtain a national passport.

Use

The Certificate of Identity may be used for travel to all countries/territories specified in the travel document, apart from the bearer's country of citizenship if they are not stateless.

The holder of a Canadian Certificate of Identity issued by virtue of their statelessness and legally resident in Canada can enter Slovenia visa-free for a maximum of 90 days within a 180-day period. This visa exemption does not apply to those who hold a Certificate of Identity because they have been unable to obtain a national passport, rather than being stateless.

The holder of a Canadian Certificate of Identity issued under any category can not travel to Germany, nor apply for a Schengen visa at a German embassy as Germany does not recognize this document.

References

External links
Passport Canada: Travel documents

Immigration to Canada
Certificate of Identity